Dabuka is a major railway marshalling yard in central Zimbabwe. It is near Gweru.

See also 
 List of rail yards

References

External links 
 travelingluck

Rail infrastructure in Zimbabwe